Edgar Francis Hall  (14 August 1888 – 9 February 1987) was an Anglican priest: the Archdeacon of Totnes from 1948 until 1962.

He was  educated at Jesus College, Oxford, and ordained in 1915. He was a Curate of St James’, Exeter, then Vicar of Leusden. He was the Chairman of the Church of England Council for Education from 1949 to 1958.

References

1888 births
Alumni of Jesus College, Oxford
Archdeacons of Totnes
1987 deaths